A Harlem mugger is an alcoholic cocktail usually made with 1/2 oz vodka, 1/2 oz gin, 1/2 oz white rum, 1/2 oz tequila, and 3 oz Champagne, topped with cranberry juice. It is normally served straight up and garnished with a wedge of lime.

References
http://www.drinksmixer.com/drink4225.html
http://www.shot-cocktail-recipe.com/cocktail-recipes/harlem_mugger.html
http://www.drinkswap.com/harlem-mugger.htm
http://www.webtender.com/db/drink/2153
http://www.1001cocktails.com/recipes/mixed-drinks/103863/cocktail-harlem-mugger.html

Cocktails with vodka
Cocktails with gin
Cocktails with rum
Cocktails with tequila
Cocktails with Champagne